The 1980 Giro d'Italia was the 63rd edition of the Giro d'Italia, one of cycling's Grand Tours. The field consisted of 130 riders, and 89 riders finished the race.

By rider

By nationality

References

1980 Giro d'Italia
1980